Zoë E. Bell (born November 17, 1978) is a New Zealand stuntwoman and actress. Some of her most notable stunt-work includes doubling for Lucy Lawless in Xena: Warrior Princess and for Uma Thurman in Kill Bill.

As an actress, Bell has appeared on television and in feature-films; she has starred in the web series Angel of Death. She is probably most recognized for playing herself in the Quentin Tarantino film Death Proof. In 2015, she appeared in an acting role in Tarantino's film The Hateful Eight, and during 2019 appeared in an acting role in Tarantino's Once Upon a Time in Hollywood in addition to her role as stunt coordinator and stuntwoman.

She was Cate Blanchett's stunt double in the 2017 release Thor: Ragnarok.

Early life
Bell was born on Waiheke Island, New Zealand, to Tish, a nurse, and Andrew Bell, a doctor. She has a younger brother named Jake and a foster brother named Leonhard, who is living in his old hometown in Germany. She grew up on Waiheke Island in Auckland.

At an early age, Bell participated in competitive gymnastics and at 15 began studying taekwon-do. She also participated in dance, high diving, scuba, and track and field activities. Bell attended Auckland Girls' Grammar School and Selwyn College.

Career
Bell began her career in 1992 when her father treated a stuntman for a head injury and came home with a phone number for her to call. Her first stunt job was jumping out of a car in Shortland Street, a New Zealand soap opera.

She performed stunts for Hercules: The Legendary Journeys and Xena: Warrior Princess, both of which were filmed in New Zealand; by the fourth season of Xena, she was the stunt double for Lucy Lawless. She fractured vertebrae in her back doing wire work stunts on the show, but continued working for a week until another stunt, in which a breakaway chair was smashed on her back, incapacitated her.

After Xena, she performed in small films and on TV, including stunt co-ordinating and playing a small role in a short film, Reflections, with Adrienne Wilkinson (with whom she had previously worked on Xena). She went on to double for Uma Thurman in Quentin Tarantino's Kill Bill.

Though she was initially hired as Thurman's "crash and smash" double, the stunt team realized Bell would also make an ideal double for fight-scenes and she was trained accordingly. Bell had to learn to fight in the wushu style. Near the end of filming for Kill Bill: Volume 2, she injured her ribs and the ligaments in her wrist while simulating being thrown backwards by a shotgun blast. Bell required surgery and spent several months recuperating. After production finished on Kill Bill, she received "The Bells" sign which hung outside the home of the Vernita Green character. She later gave it to her parents. After both Kill Bill movies, she did stunt work for the movie Catwoman, in which she performed high falls and acted as a double for Sharon Stone.

In 2004, the documentary Double Dare was released. It focused primarily on Bell and veteran stuntwoman Jeannie Epper, following them during their travels in Hollywood. The film presented a view of opposing ends of the stuntwoman spectrum, with the aging Epper continuing her search for work in an industry where age is not necessarily considered an asset and Bell, then a Hollywood newcomer, trying to break into the industry. The filming of Double Dare covered Bell's career from the end of Xena to the beginning of her work on Kill Bill: Volume 1.

In 2004, Bell and Angela Meryl (Vivica A. Fox's stunt double) were nominated at the Taurus World Stunt Awards in the categories "Best Overall Stunt by a Woman" and "Best Fight" for their doubling of the knife fight between the characters Beatrix Kiddo and Vernita Green in Kill Bill: Volume 1. In 2005, Bell was nominated for a Taurus in the categories "Best Overall Stunt by a Woman", "Best Fight" and "Best High Work". She and Monica Staggs (Daryl Hannah's double) won Best Overall Stunt and Best Fight for their fight in Budd's trailer in Kill Bill: Volume 2. Her Best High Work nomination was for a fall of over 200 feet in the film Catwoman.

After Catwoman, Bell performed stunts in the action thriller The Kingdom and another Tarantino film, Inglourious Basterds.

Tarantino cast her in a leading role in his next film, Death Proof (2007), in which she played herself and performed her own stunts, the most notable of which occurred when she clung to the hood of a speeding 1970 Dodge Challenger.

In August 2007, Bell said she had signed to play the lead role in a film about an American soldier who, upon returning to the U.S. from a tour of duty in Iraq, helps a young girl in trouble. She said she would do her own stunts in the film, and that the American accent was "a big challenge".

Bell appeared in episode seven of the fourth season of Lost, playing the role of the freighter team's radio contact, Regina. She said that the role required a little acting and some stunt work.

In 2008, Bell starred alongside her former Xena colleague Lucy Lawless in Sony (Crackle)'s web series Angel of Death which debuted online in early 2009.

Bell also played a medical technician who moonlights as "Bloody Holly", a roller derby star, in Drew Barrymore's 2009 directorial debut, Whip It.

She appeared alongside Wesley Snipes in the Italian director Giorgio Serafini's 2010 thriller, Game of Death. She can also be seen in the music video of Noel Gallagher's High Flying Birds' 2012 single "Dream On".

Bell signed with CAA in August 2020.

Filmography

Awards and nominations

References

External links

Zoë Bell Producer Profile for The 1 Second Film

1978 births
Living people
New Zealand expatriate actresses in the United States
New Zealand film actresses
New Zealand web series actresses
New Zealand female taekwondo practitioners
New Zealand stunt performers
People educated at Auckland Girls' Grammar School
People from Waiheke Island
20th-century New Zealand actresses
21st-century New Zealand actresses
People educated at Selwyn College, Auckland